Maeve O'Rourke is an Irish human rights lawyer. She is known for her involvement in seeking access for survivors and adopted people to their own personal data, and the publication of appropriately anonymised administrative files, contained in 'historical' abuse archives in Ireland including the archives of the Commission of Investigation into Mother and Baby Homes, the Ryan Commission that investigated Industrial and Reformatory Schools, and the 'McAleese' Committee that inquired into Magdalene Laundries. As of 2020, she lectures in Human Rights Law at the Irish Centre for Human Rights in NUIG. She is a member of Justice for Magdalenes Research. O'Rourke campaigns on behalf of unmarried mothers and their children. She has represented victims before the Irish Human Rights Commission, and numerous United Nations human rights treaty bodies. In October 2020, she was critical of the Government's statement that it intended to 'seal' information regarding Ireland's mother and baby homes for 30 years.

Her father is broadcaster Sean O'Rourke. She married Labour Party 2020 General Election candidate and employment solicitor Ciarán Ahern on 4 January 2020.

References 

Living people
21st-century Irish lawyers
Year of birth missing (living people)
Irish women lawyers